Matt Weitzman (born November 13, 1967) is an American producer and writer. He was one of the creators of American Dad! along with Seth MacFarlane and Mike Barker. Barker and Weitzman were originally writers for Family Guy.

Weitzman has written on ten television shows, including Daddy Dearest, Off Centre and Damon.

Biography
Matt Weitzman was born in Seattle, Washington and is Jewish. He attended American University, where he became a brother of Alpha Epsilon Pi,. 

Weitzman co-created American Dad! and was an original writer on Family Guy, a contributor on PJ's and Father of the Pride.

He is married to Tessa Weitzman, daughter of screenwriter Jeffrey Boam.  

In 2000, Weitzman was nominated for an Emmy for his work on Family Guy. Then in 2009 and 2012, American Dad! was nominated for an Emmys. In 2006, American Dad! was nominated for a GLAAD excellence in television award.

See also
 American Dad!
 "Pilot" (American Dad!)
 "Stan Knows Best"
 Mister P

References

External links

1967 births
Living people
People from Los Angeles
American animators
American animated film producers
American television writers
American male television writers
American University School of Communication alumni
Screenwriters from California
Robert Meltzer Award winners